Sheraton Lagos Hotel is a five-star conference centre hotel in Lagos

History
Established in 1985, and built in Ikeja the state's capital, it is one of the largest hotels in Nigeria. Sheraton Lagos hotel is part of the Marriott International chain of Hotels.

Design
The hotel building comprises 337 guest rooms and suites, in a six multistory building, with environs including the Murtala Muhammed International Airport, Spar shopping mall and Club Vegas. Sheraton Lagos Hotels also has a sister hotel on the Island named Four Point by Sheraton.

Events
Sheraton Hotels Lagos has five moderately sized convention centres and events that have taken place there include wedding, conferences and International exhibitions. The banquet hall which is the largest, has a sitting capacity of up to 300 people.

Restaurants/Bars
There are five restaurants and bars within the hotel complex
La Giara Italian Restaurant which serves majorly Italian cuisines, wines and pizzas.
Pool Terrace Bar Poolside bar and drinking spot
Pumpkin Leaf
Goodies Pub
Lobby Bar and Lounge

See also
List of hotels in Nigeria
Eko Hotels and Suites

References

Hotels established in 1985
Hotel buildings completed in 1985
1985 establishments in Nigeria
Hotels in Lagos
Resorts in Nigeria
Sheraton hotels
20th-century architecture in Nigeria